Sahender Singh is an Indian politician and a member of 17th Legislative Assembly of Chhaprauli, Uttar Pradesh of India. He represents the Chhaprauli constituency of Uttar Pradesh and is a member of the Bharatiya Janta Party. He was elected as the MLA of RashtriyaLokDal but was expelled from party in 2018 due to Anti-party activities.

Political career
Singh has been a member of the 17th Legislative Assembly of Uttar Pradesh on RLD ticket. Since 2017, he has represented the Chhaprauli constituency and is a member of the BJP.

Posts held

See also
Uttar Pradesh Legislative Assembly

References

Uttar Pradesh MLAs 2017–2022
Rashtriya Lok Dal politicians
Living people
Year of birth missing (living people)
Bharatiya Janata Party politicians from Uttar Pradesh
People from Bagpat district